Allston–Brighton is a set of two interlocking neighborhoods, Allston and Brighton, both part of the city of Boston, Massachusetts.

Geography

Allston and Brighton's border runs along Everett Street in the north, south along Gordon Street, and terminates at the Brookline town line along Kelton Street (with land to the east of these streets falling in Allston, to the west, Brighton).

Allston and Brighton are also identified by their respective postal zip codes (Allston's is 02134, Brighton's is 02135). Allston is generally understood as being in the northeast corner of Allston–Brighton, while Brighton is seen as the larger southwestern portion of Allston–Brighton encompassing Brighton Center and the generally less urbanized neighborhoods. They are connected to the rest of Boston by a tiny strip of land containing Boston University along the Charles River, with Brookline lying to the south and southeast, Cambridge to the north and Newton to the west, so they retain a very distinct neighborhood identity together.

Allston–Brighton is often perceived as being separate from the rest of the city since many urbanized Greater Boston areas such as Cambridge and Somerville are independently governed cities, but it is in fact part of the city of Boston. It is divided by the Massachusetts Turnpike (also known as Interstate 90) into the main southern area and a smaller northern "spur" separated from Cambridge by the Charles River.

History
Allston–Brighton was formerly an agrarian area known as Little Cambridge. It was incorporated into the city of Boston and received one of the earliest streetcar lines, becoming one of the nation's first streetcar suburbs and home to some of Boston's moderately wealthy classes.

Demographics
Today the area is a middle-class urbanized area occupied largely by a mix of dense residential neighbourhoods and small businesses.  It is home to the New Balance Headquarters, and the WGBH Educational Foundation, operators of radio & television stations WGBH,  WGBH-TV, & WGBX-TV; public broadcasters responsible for a large amount of national programming. Students from Boston's many universities are a large demographic in the area, and many residents resent the ongoing expansion of the Boston College and Harvard University campuses . Thanks in large part to students, Brighton Avenue at the heart of Allston has become a major nightlife destination featuring many bars, restaurants, and nightclubs.

Sports
The combined neighborhood supports a youth hockey team, "Allston–Brighton Youth Hockey" which holds most practices at the Reilly Memorial Rink in Cleveland Circle.

See also
Neighborhoods in Boston
Allston, Boston
Brighton, Boston
District 9, Boston

References

Further reading
 Brighton Board of Trade history page
 Dr. William P. Marchione, "A Short History of Allston-Brighton" 
 Dr. William P. Marchione, The Bull in the Garden (1986) 
 Dr. William P. Marchione, Images of America: Allston–Brighton (1996) 
 Excerpts from "Historical Allston-Brighton"
1871 Atlas of Massachusetts. by Wall & Gray.Map of Massachusetts. Map of Middlesex County.
 History of Middlesex County, Massachusetts, Compiled by Samuel Adams Drake, published 1879, Volume1 page 278 Brighton, by Rev. Frederic Whitney.   Note Brighton was originally part of Middlesex County before joining Boston which is Suffolk County.

External links 

. A good map of roads and rail lines around East Allston/Brighton, showing the town line brook of Brookline.
. See 1903 west maps. Click (slowly and repeatedly) on bottom right of small map image for big map image if your MSIE resize is on.
1871 Atlas of Massachusetts. by Wall & Gray. Map of Massachusetts. Map of Middlesex County.
 History of Middlesex County, Massachusetts, Compiled by Samuel Adams Drake, published 1879, by Rev. Frederic Whitney. Note Brighton was originally part of Middlesex County before joining Boston which is Suffolk County.

Brighton, Boston
Irish-American neighborhoods
Neighborhoods in Boston